The Misfit is a bar and restaurant in Santa Monica, California.

Description 
The Misfit is a bar and restaurant in Santa Monica's Clock Tower Building. Focused on American (or New American) cuisine, the menu has included avocado toast with burrata, tomato, and sourdough, lobster rolls, and macaroni and cheese. The happy hour menu has food and drink options. The Jumping Jack Flash is made with ginger, mint, and Buffalo Trace. The Misfit has a patio. Lonely Planet says, "This darkly lit emporium of food, drink and fun is notable for the decent menu and phenomenal cocktails made from craftsman spirits. Set in a historic building decked out with a retro interior, it's busy from brunch to last call."

History 
LGO Hospitality opened The Misfit in a space which previously housed Anisette. Chef and LGO founder Bob Lynn developed the opening menu, which included breakfast, lunch and dinner. Bruce Kalman was hired as the opening chef. The restaurant began hiring additional staff in March 2011, and opened on April 28. Lynn has considered opening a second location in Mahnattan's West Village.

In 2011, The Misfit offered fathers select beers for 10 cents on Father's Day. Bob Lynn's son Jordan Lynn became executive chef in December 2011. In 2012, the restaurant hosted a seven-course tasting menu with drinks and a champagne toast for New Year's Eve. The Misfit offered outdoor dining during the COVID-19 pandemic.

Reception 
Annie Fitzsimmons recommended the restaurant "for gourmet comfort food and signature cocktails" in National Geographic's 2013 overview of "The Best of Santa Monica". Matthew King included The Misfit in Eater LA's 2014 list of "19 Places to Enjoy Happy Hour Right Now in Los Angeles", writing: "One of the most reliable happy hour scenes in Santa Monica, which means discounted drinks, sangria, cocktails, mimosas, beer and wine, everyday from 12 to 7 p.m., which is perfect for tourists, beach bums, and folks who don't have to hit the office at normal hours." The business was included in Time Out Los Angeles' 2014 list of "the best happy hour deals in Santa Monica."

See also 

 List of New American restaurants

References

External links 

 
 The Misfit Restaurant + Bar, Santa Monica Travel & Tourism
 The Misfit Restaurant + Bar at Zomato

2011 establishments in California
Culture in Santa Monica, California
Drinking establishments in California
New American restaurants in California
Restaurants established in 2011